SpongeBob SquarePants is the protagonist of the American animated television series of the same name. Voiced by Tom Kenny, he is characterized by his optimism and childlike attitude. SpongeBob is commonly seen hanging out with his friend Patrick Star, working at the Krusty Krab, and attending Mrs. Puff's Boating School.

SpongeBob was created and designed by Stephen Hillenburg, an artist and marine science educator. The character's name is derived from "Bob the Sponge", the host of Hillenburg's unpublished educational book The Intertidal Zone. He drew the book while teaching marine biology to visitors of the Ocean Institute during the 1980s. Hillenburg began developing a show based on the premise shortly after the 1996 cancellation of Rocko's Modern Life, which Hillenburg directed. SpongeBob's first appearance was in the pilot, "Help Wanted", which premiered on May 1, 1999.

SpongeBob SquarePants has become popular among children and adults. The character has garnered a positive response from media critics and is frequently named as one of the greatest cartoon characters of all time. He has, however, been involved in a controversy with some conservative social groups for allegedly promoting homosexuality, although Hillenburg has described the character as biologically asexual (as real-life sea sponges are).

Role in SpongeBob SquarePants
SpongeBob is a good-natured, naive, and enthusiastic sea sponge. In The SpongeBob Musical, his exact species of animal is identified: Aplysina fistularis, a yellow tube sponge that is common in open waters. He resides in the undersea city of Bikini Bottom with other anthropomorphic aquatic creatures. He works as a fry cook at a local fast food restaurant, the Krusty Krab, to which he is obsessively attached, showing devotion to it above other restaurants. His boss is Eugene Krabs, a greedy crab who nonetheless treats SpongeBob like a son. Squidward Tentacles, an octopus, and SpongeBob's ill-tempered, snobbish neighbor, works as the restaurant's cashier. SpongeBob's hobbies include fishing for jellyfish, practicing karate with his friend Sandy Cheeks (a squirrel from Texas), and blowing bubbles.

SpongeBob is often seen hanging around with his best friend, starfish Patrick Star, one of his neighbors. SpongeBob lives in a submerged pineapple with his pet snail, Gary. His unlimited optimistic cheer often leads him to perceive the outcome of numerous endeavors and the personalities of those around him as happier than they really are. He believes, for instance, that Squidward Tentacles enjoys his company even though he clearly harbors an intense dislike for him (though they have been shown to get along on rare occasions). SpongeBob's greatest goal in life is to obtain his driver's license from Mrs. Puff's boating school, but he often panics and crashes when driving a boat.

Character

Conception

Stephen Hillenburg first became fascinated with the ocean as a child. He began developing his artistic abilities at a young age. During college, he studied marine biology and minored in art. He planned to return to graduate school and eventually to pursue a master's degree in art. After graduating in 1984 from Humboldt State University, he joined the Ocean Institute, an organization in Dana Point, California, dedicated to educating the public about marine science and maritime history. While he was there, he had the initial idea that would lead to the creation of SpongeBob SquarePants—a comic book titled The Intertidal Zone. The host of the comic was "Bob the Sponge" who, unlike SpongeBob, resembled an actual sea sponge. In 1987, Hillenburg left the institute to pursue an animation career.

A few years after studying experimental animation at the California Institute of the Arts, Hillenburg met Joe Murray, the creator of Rocko's Modern Life, at an animation festival, and was offered a job as a director of the series. While working on the series, Hillenburg met writer Martin Olson, who saw his previous comic The Intertidal Zone. Olson liked the idea and suggested Hillenburg create a series of marine animals, which spurred his decision to create SpongeBob SquarePants. Hillenburg did not think of making a series based on The Intertidal Zone at the time, later telling Thomas F. Wilson in an interview, "a show ... I hadn't even thought about making a show ... and it wasn't my show". Hillenburg later claimed it was "the inspiration for the show". 

Rocko's Modern Life ended in 1996. Shortly afterwards, Hillenburg began working on SpongeBob SquarePants. He began drawing and took some of the show's characters from his comic—like starfish, crab, and sponge. At the time, Hillenburg knew that "everybody was doing buddy shows"—like The Ren & Stimpy Show. He stated, "I can't do a buddy show," so he decided to do a "one character" show instead. He conceived a sponge as the title character because he liked its "versatility ... as an animal." Hillenburg derived the character's name from Bob the Sponge, the host of his comic strip The Intertidal Zone, after changing it from SpongeBoy because of trademark issues.

Creation and design

Hillenburg had made several "horrible impersonations" before he finally conceived of his character. He compared the concept to Laurel and Hardy and Pee-wee Herman saying, "I think SpongeBob [was] born out of my love of Laurel and Hardy shorts. You've got that kind of idiot-buddy situation – that was a huge influence. SpongeBob was inspired by that kind of character: the Innocent – à la Stan Laurel."

The first concept sketch portrayed the character wearing a red hat with a green base and a white business shirt with a tie. SpongeBob's look gradually changed. He also wore brown pants used in the final design. SpongeBob was designed to be a childlike character who was goofy and optimistic in a style similar to that made famous by Jerry Lewis.

Originally, the character was to be named SpongeBoy (and the series named SpongeBoy Ahoy!), but this name was already in use for another product. This was discovered after voice acting for the original seven-minute pilot was recorded. Upon learning this, Hillenburg knew that the character's name still had to contain "Sponge" so viewers would not mistake him for a "Cheese Man". In 1997, he decided to use the name "SpongeBob" with "SquarePants" as a family name, with the latter referring to the character's square shape and having a "nice ring to it".

Before commissioning SpongeBob as a full series, Nickelodeon executives insisted that it would not be popular unless the main character was a child who went to school. Stephen Hillenburg recalled in 2012 that Nickelodeon told him, "Our winning formula is animation about kids in school... We want you to put SpongeBob in school." Hillenburg was ready to "walk out" on Nickelodeon and abandon the series since he wanted SpongeBob to be an adult character. He eventually compromised by adding a new character to the main cast, Mrs. Puff, who is SpongeBob's boat-driving teacher. Hillenburg was happy with the compromise and said, "A positive thing for me that came out of it was [how it brought] in a new character, Mrs. Puff, who I love."

Episodes from 2000 and 2001 have given SpongeBob's birthdate as July 14, 1986, although his age is left unclear throughout the series.

SpongeBob has demonstrated an ability to shapeshift, for example into the shape of Texas or his friends.

Voice

SpongeBob is voiced by veteran voice actor Tom Kenny who had worked previously with Hillenburg on Rocko's Modern Life. When Hillenburg created SpongeBob SquarePants, he approached Kenny to voice the character. Hillenburg used Kenny's and other people's personalities while creating SpongeBob's.

Kenny said in an episode of WTF with Marc Maron that the voice was based on a bitter dwarf actor he encountered while auditioning for a television commercial. Kenny had originally used SpongeBob's voice for a minor background character in Rocko's Modern Life. At first, Kenny forgot the voice because he had used it only on that occasion. Hillenburg remembered it when he was coming up with SpongeBob, however, and played a video clip of the Rocko episode to remind Kenny of the voice. When Hillenburg heard Kenny do the voice, he said, "That's it—I don't want to hear anybody else do the voice. We've got SpongeBob." Kenny recalled that Nickelodeon was unsure of his casting and said, "Well, let's just listen to 100 more people." The network hoped to find a celebrity for the part. Kenny noted: "But one of the advantages of having a strong creator is that the creator can say, 'No, I like that—I don't care about celebrities'." Kenny recalls Hillenburg "let them know that in no uncertain terms." SpongeBob's high-pitched laugh was specifically designed to be unique according to Kenny. They wanted an annoying laugh in the tradition of Popeye and Woody Woodpecker.

Throughout the series, SpongeBob's voice evolved from "low-key" to high-pitched. Kenny said, "I hear the change... It's mostly a question of the pitch." He said that, "It's unconscious on my part" because "I don't wake up and think, 'Hmm, I'm going to change SpongeBob's voice today, just for the hell of it'." He described it as "like erosion: a very slow process. As time goes on, you need to bring him to different places and more places, the more stories and scripts you do." Contrasting first-season episodes to those of the seventh season, Kenny said that "there's a bit of a change [in the voice], but I don't think it's that extreme at all."

When SpongeBob SquarePants was prepared for broadcast in languages other than English, the voice actors dubbing SpongeBob's voice used Tom Kenny's rendition of the character as a starting point but added unique elements. For example, in the French version of the series, SpongeBob speaks with a slight Daffy Duck-style lisp.

Reception

Critical reception
Throughout SpongeBob SquarePants first run, the SpongeBob character became popular with both children and adults. In June 2010, Entertainment Weekly named him one of the "100 Greatest Characters of the Last 20 Years". TV Guide listed SpongeBob SquarePants at number nine on its "50 Greatest Cartoon Characters of All Time" list. 

James Poniewozik of Time magazine considered the character "the anti-Bart Simpson, temperamentally and physically: his head is as squared-off and neat as Bart's is unruly, and he has a personality to match–conscientious, optimistic and blind to the faults in the world and those around him." The New York Times critic Joyce Millman said, "His relentless good cheer would be irritating if he weren't so darned lovable and his world so excellently strange ... Like Pee-wee's Playhouse, SpongeBob joyfully dances on the fine line between childhood and adulthood, guilelessness and camp, the warped and the sweet." Robert Thompson, a professor of communications and director of the Center for the Study of Popular Television at Syracuse University, told The New York Times:There is something kind of unique about [SpongeBob]. It seems to be a refreshing breath from the pre-irony era. There's no sense of the elbow-in-rib, a tongue-in-cheek aesthetic that so permeates the rest of American culture–including kids' shows like the Rugrats. I think what's subversive about it is it's so incredibly naive–deliberately. Because there's nothing in it that's trying to be hip or cool or anything else, hipness can be grafted onto it.

In a 2007 interview with TV Guide, Barack Obama named SpongeBob his favorite TV character, saying SpongeBob SquarePants was "the show I watch with my daughters".

Criticism and controversy
In 2005, a promotional video which showed SpongeBob along with other characters from children's shows singing together to promote diversity and tolerance, was criticized by a Christian evangelical group in the United States because they felt the SpongeBob character was being used as an advocate for homosexuality, though the video contained "no reference to sex, sexual lifestyle or sexual identity." James Dobson of Focus on the Family accused the video's makers of promoting homosexuality because a gay rights group had sponsored the video.

The incident led to the question whether SpongeBob is a homosexual character. In 2002, when SpongeBob's popularity with gay men grew, Hillenburg denied the suggestion. He clarified that he considers the character to be "somewhat asexual." SpongeBob has been shown in various episodes to regenerate his limbs and reproduce by "budding", much like real sponges do. After Dobson's comments, Hillenburg repeated his assertion that sexual preference was never considered during the creation of the show. Tom Kenny and other production members were shocked and surprised that such an issue had arisen.

Dobson later said that his comments were taken out of context and that his original complaints were not with SpongeBob or any of the characters in the video but with the organization that sponsored it, the We Are Family Foundation. Dobson noted that the foundation had posted pro-homosexual material on its website, but later removed it. After the controversy, John H. Thomas, the United Church of Christ's general minister and president, said they would welcome SpongeBob into their ministry. He said, "Jesus didn't turn people away. Neither do we."

Jeffrey P. Dennis, author of the journal article "The Same Thing We Do Every Night: Signifying Same-Sex Desire in Television Cartoons", argued that SpongeBob and Sandy are not romantically in love while adding that he believed that SpongeBob and Patrick "are paired with arguably erotic intensity." Dennis noted the two are "not consistently coded as romantic partners," since they live in separate residences, and have distinct groups of friends but claimed that in the series, "the possibility of same-sex desire is never excluded." Martin Goodman of Animation World Magazine described Dennis's comments regarding SpongeBob and Patrick as "interesting".

In April 2009, in a tie-in partnership with Burger King and Nickelodeon, Burger King released an advertisement featuring SpongeBob and Sir Mix-a-Lot singing "Baby Got Back". Angry parents and the Campaign for a Commercial-Free Childhood protested the ad for being sexist and inappropriately sexual, especially considering SpongeBob's fan base includes pre-schoolers. Susan Linn, the director of the Campaign for Commercial-Free Childhood said: "It's bad enough when companies use a beloved media character like SpongeBob to promote junk food to children, but it's utterly reprehensible when that character simultaneously promotes objectified, sexualized images of women." In an official statement released by Burger King, the company claimed the campaign was aimed at parents.

After Nickelodeon shared a celebratory Pride Month tweet featuring SpongeBob SquarePants wearing a rainbow-colored tie in June 2020, users online believed it was the network's way of quietly announcing that the TV cartoon character was gay. The tweet read, “Celebrating #Pride with the LGBTQ+ community and their allies this month and every month Rainbow,” and along with SpongeBob, included photos of transgender actor Michael D. Cohen, who plays Schwoz Schwartz on Henry Danger, and Korra from the Avatar spin-off show Legend of Korra, who's in a same-sex relationship in the series, are presented in a rainbow color collage, appearing as if they are all part of the same LGBTQ community. This tweet received large amounts of backlash from upset parents.

Cultural impact and legacy

Throughout SpongeBob SquarePants run, the SpongeBob character became very popular with viewers of all ages. His popularity spread from Nickelodeon's original demographic of two- to eleven-year-olds, to teenagers and adults, was popular on college campuses and with celebrities such as Sigourney Weaver and Bruce Willis. Salon.com's Stephanie Zacharek feels that the unadulterated innocence of SpongeBob is what makes him so appealing. SpongeBob also became popular with gay men, despite Stephen Hillenburg asserting that none of the series' characters are homosexual, attracting fans with his flamboyant lifestyle and tolerant attitude.

In July 2009, the Madame Tussauds wax museum in New York unveiled a wax sculpture of SpongeBob, the first fictional character to be featured there. In May 2011, a new species of mushroom, Spongiforma squarepantsii, named after SpongeBob, was described in the journal Mycologia. The authors note that the hymenium, when viewed using scanning electron microscopy, somewhat resembles a "seafloor covered with tube sponges, reminiscent of the fictitious home of SpongeBob." Although the epithet was originally rejected by Mycologias editors as "too frivolous", the authors insisted that "we could name it whatever we liked." Since 2004, SpongeBob has appeared as a balloon in the Macy's Thanksgiving Day Parade.

The character also became a fashion trend. In 2008, American fashion designer Marc Jacobs donned a SpongeBob tattoo on his right arm. He explained that, "I just worked with Richard Prince on the collaboration for Louis Vuitton and Richard has done a series of paintings of SpongeBob. He had brought up in our conversation how he saw the artistic value of SpongeBob as the cartoon and I kind of liked it, so I did it." He added that "It's funny." In the same year, A Bathing Ape released SpongeBob-themed shoes. Singer Pharrell Williams backed a line of SpongeBob T-shirts and shoes targeted at hip adults. In 2014, the character was among the popular culture icons referenced by American fashion designer Jeremy Scott in his Moschino debut collection at the Milan Fashion Week.

In Egypt's Tahrir Square, after the Egyptian Revolution of 2011, SpongeBob became a fashion phenomenon, appearing on various merchandise items from hijabs to boxer shorts. The phenomenon led to the creation of the Tumblr project called "SpongeBob on the Nile", founded by American students Andrew Leber and Elisabeth Jaquette, that attempts to document every appearance of SpongeBob in Egypt. Sherief Elkeshta cited the phenomenon in an essay about the incoherent state of politics in Egypt in an independent monthly paper titled Midan Masr. He wrote, "Why isn't he [SpongeBob] at least holding a Molotov cocktail? Or raising a fist?" The phenomenon has even spread to Libya, where a Libyan rebel in SpongeBob dress was photographed celebrating the revolution.

Merchandising
SpongeBob's translated well into related merchandise sales. In 2002, SpongeBob SquarePants dolls sold at a rate of 75,000 per week, which was faster than Tickle Me Elmo dolls were selling at the time. SpongeBob was popular in Japan, specifically with Japanese women. Nickelodeon's parent company Viacom purposefully targeted its marketing at women there as a way to build the SpongeBob SquarePants brand. Skeptics initially doubted that SpongeBob could be popular in Japan as the character's design is very different from the already popular designs for Hello Kitty and Pikachu. The character inspired a soap-filled sponge product manufactured by SpongeTech.

In early 2009, the Simmons Jewelry Co. released a $75,000 diamond pendant as part of a SpongeBob collection.

On May 17, 2013, Build-A-Bear Workshop introduced a new SpongeBob SquarePants collection in stores and online in North America.

SpongeBob also inspired an automobile design. On July 13, 2013, Toyota, with Nickelodeon, unveiled plans for a SpongeBob-inspired Toyota Highlander. The 2014 Toyota Highlander concept vehicle was launched as part of a SpongeBob Day promotion at that day's game between the Giants and Padres in San Diego, and subsequently visited seven U.S. locations including the Nickelodeon Suites Resort Orlando in Florida.

Notes

References

Bibliography

External links
 SpongeBob SquarePants at Don Markstein's Toonopedia. Archived from the original on August 8, 2017.

Animated characters introduced in 1999
Animation controversies in television
Comedy film characters
Anthropomorphic invertebrates
Fictional asexuals
Fictional characters with accelerated healing
Fictional chefs
Fictional karateka
Fictional shapeshifters
Fictional undersea characters
LGBT-related controversies in animation
LGBT-related controversies in television
LGBT-related controversies in the United States
Male characters in animated series
Nicktoon characters
SpongeBob SquarePants characters
Television characters introduced in 1999
Television controversies in the United States